Cinnamtannin B1 is a condensed tannin found in Cinnamomum verum. It is a type A proanthocyanidin.

Cinnamon could have some pharmacological effects in the treatment of type 2 diabetes mellitus and insulin resistance. The plant material used in the study was mostly from Chinese cinnamon (see Chinese cinnamon's medicinal uses). Recent studies in phytochemistry have indicated that cinnamtannin B1 isolated from C. Verum bears possible therapeutic effect on type 2 diabetes, with the exception of the postmenopausal patients studied on Cinnamomum aromaticum.

Cinnamtannin B1 possesses several phenolic hydroxyl groups and is reported to exhibit antioxidant property, antimicrobial activities, and anti-platelet aggregation that may protect damaged tissues in wounds

References 

Procyanidins
Natural phenol trimers